Christian August Lobeck (5 June 1781 – 25 August 1860) was a German classical scholar.

Lobeck was born at Naumburg, in the Electorate of Saxony. After studying at the universities of Jena and Leipzig, he became Privatdozent at the University of Wittenberg in 1802, and in 1810 was appointed to a professorship there. Four years later, he accepted the chair of rhetoric and ancient literature at Königsberg, which he occupied till within two years of his death.

His literary activities were devoted to the history of Greek religion and to the Greek language and literature. His most important work, Aglaophamus (1829), maintains, against the views put forward by G. F. Creuzer in his Symbolik (1810–1823), that the religion of the Greek mysteries (especially those of Eleusis) did not essentially differ from the national religion; that it was not esoteric, and that the priests as such neither taught nor possessed any higher knowledge of God; that the Oriental elements were a later importation.

Lobeck's edition of the Ajax of Sophocles (1809) had gained him a reputation a scholar and critic; his Phrynichus (1820), Paralipomena grammaticae Graecae (vol. I–II; 1837), Pathologiae sermonis Graeci prolegomena (1843), and Pathologiae Graeci sermonis elementa (vol. I–II; 1853–62) reveal his wide acquaintance with Greek grammar. He had little sympathy with comparative philology, holding that it needed a lifetime to acquire a thorough knowledge of a single language.

See the article by L. Friedländer in Allgemeine deutsche Biographie; Conrad Bursian's Geschichte der klassischen Philologie in Deutschland (1883); Lehrs, Populäre Aufsätze aus dem Altertum (2nd ed., Leipzig, 1875); Lüdwich, Ausgewählte Briefe von und an Chr. Aug. Lobeck und K. Lehrs''' (1894); also JE Sandys, History of Classical Scholarship'' (1st ed. 1908).

Notes

References

1781 births
1860 deaths
People from Naumburg (Saale)
People from the Electorate of Saxony
German classical scholars
Recipients of the Pour le Mérite (civil class)